The La Porte City Station, also known as the La Porte City Hall, is a historic building located in La Porte City, Iowa, United States.  It was built as a depot for the Waterloo, Cedar Falls & Northern Railroad, an interurban system.  The system began in 1885 as the Waterloo Street Railway Co., and grew to include routes to Cedar Falls (1897), Denver, Iowa (1901), and Waverly (1906).  In 1912 it was expanded to Cedar Rapids, and this building was constructed at that time.  It is a single-story, brick, Georgian Revival structure.  It served as a depot until 1928, when it was replaced by a new building that was more freight focused rather than passenger focused as this depot was.  This building was acquired by La Porte City at that time for use as a city hall.  The community's public library was organized in 1945, and it was located here as well.  The building was listed on the National Register of Historic Places in 1979.  The library has subsequently been moved to a different building on Main Street.

References

Railway stations in the United States opened in 1912
Railway stations closed in 1928
Former railway stations in Iowa
Georgian Revival architecture in Iowa
La Porte City, Iowa
City and town halls in Iowa
Transportation buildings and structures in Black Hawk County, Iowa
National Register of Historic Places in Black Hawk County, Iowa
Railway stations on the National Register of Historic Places in Iowa
1912 establishments in Iowa